Moussa Diagana (M'Bout, 1946 – 2018) was a Mauritanian French language writer. He studied in Nouakchott, Tunisia and the Sorbonne and worked in Mali.

He died on the night of 15 January 2018.

Works
La Légende du Wagadu, vue par Sïa Yatabéré, 1988 (theatre)
Targuiya, 2001 (theatre)

External links
La Maison des auteurs

References

1946 births
2018 deaths
Ambassadors of Mauritania to Germany
Mauritanian male writers
Mauritanian dramatists and playwrights
20th-century dramatists and playwrights
21st-century dramatists and playwrights
Male dramatists and playwrights
People from Gorgol Region
20th-century male writers
21st-century male writers